At the 2007 Pan Arab Games, the athletics events were held at the Military Academy Stadium in Cairo, Egypt from 21 to 24 November. A total of 46 events were contested, of which 23 by male and 23 by female athletes. Morocco was the most successful nation in the competition, taking ten gold medals in a 23-medal haul. Sudan and Tunisia won the second and third greatest number of golds with 8 and 7. The host country, Egypt, achieved six gold medals but also shared the joint highest total medal count with Morocco. Seven Games records were beaten at the 2007 edition of the event.

Amr Ibrahim Mostafa Seoud of Egypt and Gretta Taslakian of Lebanon achieved the 100/200 metres double on the men's and women's sides, respectively. Sudan's Abubaker Kaki Khamis won both the men's 800 metres and 1500 metres, setting a Games record in the latter, and Abdelkader Hachlaf went unbeaten in both the 5000 metres and 3000 m steeplechase. Mona Jabir Adam Ahmed won the heptathlon and 400 m hurdles titles and also won a gold and a silver with Sudan in the women's relays. Her relay team-mate Nawal El Jack also won four medals, having taken the women's 400 metres race and the silver in the 200 m. Fadwa Al Bouza showed multiple talents by winning the women's triple jump and finishing third in the 100 m hurdles.

Records
In addition to the records set by medalling athletes at the 2007 Games, the following records were set by others competing in Cairo:

Men

Women

Medal summary

Men

Women

Medal table

Participating nations

 (17)
 (12)
 (1)
 (2)
 (31)
 (6)
 (10)
 (13)
 (6)
 (7)
 (3)
 (36)
 (10)
 (27)
 (29)
 (21)
 (5)
 (18)
 (11)
 (3)

References

Results
Jeux Panarabes RESULTATS TECHNIQUES. Fédération Algérienne d'Athlétisme. Retrieved on 2010-07-08.
Results November 2007 - Pan Arab Games. Athletics Africa. Retrieved on 2010-07-08.
Results Tunisathle Retrieved on 2011-11-24
Daily reports
Powell, David (2007-11-22). Al Khuwaildi snatches last round victory – Pan Arab Games, Day One. IAAF. Retrieved on 2010-07-08.
Powell, David (2007-11-23). Egyptian secures dash title in Cairo - Pan Arab Games, Day Two. IAAF. Retrieved on 2010-07-08.
Powell, David (2007-11-24). Morocco’s day – Pan Arab Games, Day Three. IAAF. Retrieved on 2010-07-08.
Powell, David (2007-11-25). Doubles day – Pan Arab Games, Final Day.IAAF. Retrieved on 2010-07-08.

External links
Official website (archived)

Events at the 2007 Pan Arab Games
Pan Arab Games
2007
International athletics competitions hosted by Egypt
2007 Pan Arab